This is a list of all military equipment ever used by Germany. This includes all armed forces  so aircraft, ships, guns and tanks.

etc.

Weapons 

 List of military weapons of Germany

Aircraft 

 List of military aircraft of Germany

Ships 

 List of naval ships of Germany

References

Germany
Equipment